Second Captain may refer to:

 Flag captain, or second captain, serving as the ship captain of a flagship of a fleet under an admiral whose chief of staff was the first captain of the fleet.
 Junior captain, or second captain, a type of Captain (armed forces)
 Second Captain, an antiquated rank below Captain (British Army and Royal Marines) used by the British Military during the 19th century, generally in the Ordnance and Royal Regiment of Artillery.
 Second Captains, an Irish media company
 Second Captains Live, Irish sports and entertainment show

See also
 Captain (armed forces)
 Captain (disambiguation)
 First Captain (disambiguation)